Jhuthi Sharm is a 1940 Bollywood film directed by Mohan Dayaram Bhavnani. It stars Trilok Kapoor. Produced by Mohan Dayaram Bhavnani's production company, the film is an adaption of Henrik Ibsen's 1881 play Ghosts. The title means "Naked Truth" in Hindi.

References

External links
 

1940 films
1940s Hindi-language films
Films based on works by Henrik Ibsen
Indian black-and-white films